Gallan is a surname. Notable people with the surname include:

 Grellan (died 624), also known as Gallan
 Pat Gallan (born 1965), British police officer
 José María Garza Gallán (1846–1902), Mexican politician
 Alex Allan (born 1951), British civil servant

See also
 Callan